St. John's Greek Orthodox Church is a historic church building in Pueblo, Colorado.  It was listed on the National Register of Historic Places in 2002.

It is a beautiful Classical Revival-style church.  It has two-story Ionic columns.

References

Colorado Historical Society
National Register of Historic Places

External links
Official site

Churches completed in 1907
20th-century Eastern Orthodox church buildings
Churches on the National Register of Historic Places in Colorado
Neoclassical architecture in Colorado
Churches in Pueblo, Colorado
Eastern Orthodoxy in Colorado
Greek Orthodox churches in the United States
National Register of Historic Places in Pueblo, Colorado
Neoclassical church buildings in the United States